The South Ward School is an historic building in Clearwater, Florida. It is located at 610 South Fort Harrison Avenue. On June 18, 1979, it was added to the U.S. National Register of Historic Places. It is now the home to the Clearwater Historical Society Museum and Cultural Center.

References

External links
 Pinellas County listings at National Register of Historic Places
 Florida's Office of Cultural and Historical Programs
 Pinellas County listings
 South Ward School

Buildings and structures in Clearwater, Florida
National Register of Historic Places in Pinellas County, Florida